Igor Vasilievich Dolinyak (Russian Cyrillic: игорь васильевич долиняк) (born 1935/36 - death date unknown) was a Russian writer. He was born in Leningrad (now St Petersburg) and trained as an engineer. He wrote both poetry and prose; his book of poetry Trust in Me (Поверь в меня) was published by Lenizdat in 1968. After the breakup of the USSR, the St Petersburg-based literary journal Zvezda published his story "Nakladka". In 1994, his novel Mir Tretii (The Third World) came out and was nominated for the Russian Booker Prize.

References

Russian writers

1930s births
Year of birth uncertain
Year of death missing